The FM and TV-mast Wesel is a 320.8 metre tall guyed steel framework radio mast of the Deutsche Telekom AG at Wesel-Büderich, Germany. FM and TV-mast Wesel was built in 1968 and is used for FM- and TV transmission.

FM and TV-mast Wesel is the second tallest structure in Northrhine-Westphalia. Before the construction of the chimney of Power Station Westerholt, it was the tallest structure of North Rhine-Westphalia. It reclaimed this title after the chimney's demolition on November 12, 2006.

External links
 
 http://skyscraperpage.com/diagrams/?b46675
 Picture on Google Maps

See also
List of masts

Radio masts and towers in Germany
Wesel
Buildings and structures in Wesel (district)
Towers completed in 1968
1968 establishments in West Germany